Cezary is the Polish version of the given name Caesar. Notable people with the name include:

Cezary Balicki (born 1958), Polish bridge player
Cezary Czpak (born 1982), Polish footballer, playing as a midfielder
Cezary Geroń (1960–1998), Polish poet, journalist, translator and teacher
Cezary Grabarczyk (born 1960), Polish politician
Cezary Kucharski (born 1972), Polish football player
Cezary Ostrowski (born 1962), Polish composer, musician, songwriter, author, visual artist and journalist
Cezary Pazura (born 1962), Polish actor known for comedy roles in movies such as Kiler, Chłopaki nie płaczą, etc.
Cezary Skubiszewski (born 1949), Poland-born Australian composer for film, television and orchestra
Cezary Trybański (born 1979), Polish basketball player
Cezary Wilk (born 1986), Polish footballer (midfielder)
Cezary Zamana (born 1967), Polish professional road racing cyclist

Polish masculine given names